Selma Stern-Täubler (born 24 July 1890, Kippenheim, Germany – died 17 August 1981, Basel) was one of the first women to become a professional historian in Germany, and the author of a seven-volume work (3,740 pages) The Prussian State and the Jews, her opus magnum.

Life
Selma Stern grew up in an upper-middle-class Jewish family; her father was a physician. In 1901 the family moved to Baden-Baden. In 1904 she was the first girl to attend the Großherzogliches Badisches Gymnasium, a boys highschool, from which she graduated in 1908. She studied history, philosophy and philology at the University of Heidelberg, but left after three semesters and graduated at the Ludwig Maximilian University of Munich in 1913 on Anacharsis Cloots. In 1914 she moved to Frankfurt to live with her mother and sister and started a career in German-Jewish history on a freelance basis.

Shortly after the founding of the Akademie für die Wissenschaft des Judentums in Berlin in 1919, Stern accepted an invitation to become one of its research fellows in 1920. There, she began work on the first two volumes of Der preussische Staat und die Juden, a study of Jewry under Frederick William I of Prussia, published in 1925. In 1927, Stern received her doctorate and married the director and founder of the academy, the historian Eugen Täubler. In 1936 the Täublers moved to England in an attempt to move the academy, but returned to Germany a year later.

In 1938 one of the volumes was ready to be published by the Schocken Verlag, but due to Nazi policy all the stock, including her manuscript and many documents were burned during Kristallnacht. Stern was not allowed to visit any public libraries or archives, but got help from several scholars to finish her work. In the introduction of Der preussische Staat und die Juden Stern mentions that one copy, dealing with the Jews under Frederick the Great, was saved by an anonymous female employee of Schocken publishing company, who came to their apartment in Charlottenburg at the end of November, 1938.

In 1941, Stern and Täubler fled to the United States, crossing the Atlantic on the last boat before the USA entered the Second World War. (She was allowed by the Nazis to take the only surviving copy with her.) First they lived in New York; from 1947-1955, she was in charge of Jewish-American Archives at Hebrew Union College-Jewish Institute of Religion in Cincinnati, where she worked as an archivist. Stern became a widow in 1953 without having children. In 1955 she retired and was involved in founding the Leo Baeck Institute.

In 1960 Stern moved to Basel, where her sister lived. Between 1961 and 1972 she published Der preußische Staat und die Juden, carefully referenced. Topics covered include quotas of Jews or Jewish families (Schutzjuden), bank ownership, the minting activities by the court Jews Veitel Heine Ephraim and Daniel Itzig and their trade in silver and debased coins during and after the Seven Years' War, interest, taxes and fees. In 1974 a complete index was published with the help of three co-workers. Stern obviously liked the quote "What man understands he is able to withstand", which she used more than once in the introduction of her books.

Selected works
 Anacharsis Cloots, der Redner des Menschengeschlechts. Ein Beitrag zur Geschichte der Deutschen in der Französischen Revolution. Kraus Reprint, Vadut 1965 (EA Berlin 1914, zugl. Dissertation Universität München 1914). 
 Karl Wilhelm Ferdinand. Herzog zu Braunschweig und Lüneburg. Lax, Hildesheim 1921. 
 Jud Süß. Ein Beitrag zur deutschen und jüdischen Geschichte. Müller Verlag, München 1973 (unaltered new ed., Berlin 1929). 
 with Ludwig Lewisohn (trans.). The Spirit Returneth: a novel. Philadelphia: Jewish Publication Society of America, 1946.
 The Court Jew; a contribution to the history of the period of absolutism in Central Europe. Philadelphia: Jewish Publication Society of America, 1950. Full text online at archive.org
 Der preußische Staat und die Juden. Mohr, Tübingen 1962 (7 vols.) 1. Teil: Die Zeit des Großen Kurfürsten und Friedrichs I. 2 Abteilungen: Darstellung/Akten. 2. Teil: Die Zeit Friedrich Wilhelms I. 2 Abteil. 3. Teil. Die Zeit Friedrichs des Großen. 2 Abt.: Darstellung/Akten in 2 Halbbänden. 4. Teil. Gesamtregister.
 Josel of Rosheim, commander of Jewry in the Holy Roman Empire of the German nation. 1st ed. Philadelphia: Jewish Publication Society of America, 1965. Translated by Gertrude Hirschler. 1965.
 Ihr seid meine Zeugen. Ein Novellenkranz aus der Zeit des Schwarzen Todes 1348/19. Müller Verlag, München 1972.

References

External links

Laxton, Susan. "Selma Stern-Taeubler", Jewish Women: A Comprehensive Historical Encyclopedia, Jewish Women's Archive, 20 March 2009; accessed 4 May 2014. 
 Selma Stern (1890-1981): das Eigene in der Geschichte : Selbstentwürfe und Geschichtsentwürfe einer Historikerin von Marina Sassenberg
 Short biography by Marina Sassenberg
 Juden an der Universität Heidelberg Dokumente aus sieben Jahrhunderten
 Guide to the Papers of Selma Stern-Taeubler
 DR. SELMA STERN-TAEUBLER 80

1890 births
1981 deaths
People from Ortenaukreis
People from the Grand Duchy of Baden
19th-century German Jews
Judaic scholars
Jews and Judaism in Berlin
Jewish emigrants from Nazi Germany to the United States
20th-century German historians
German women historians
20th-century German women writers
Jewish women writers
Leo Baeck Institute
Hochschule für die Wissenschaft des Judentums alumni
Jewish historians